Stephanie Losee (born 1965 and raised in Cold Spring Harbor, New York) is an American author, journalist, and Head of Communications & Brand at Nova Credit. Her previous roles were Head of Content for Visa, Executive Director of Brand Content for POLITICO, and Managing Editor of Dell Global Marketing, where she directed editorial content strategy. 

Losee co-wrote the nonfiction books Office Mate: The Employee Handbook for Finding--and Managing--Romance on the Job with Helaine Olen (Adams Media: 2007) and You've Only Got Three Seconds: How to Make the Right Impression in Your Business and Social Life with Camille Lavington (Doubleday: 1997). 

Her works have appeared in five anthologies: The Maternal is Political, Cup of Comfort for Writers, Horse Crazy, Six-Word Memoirs on Love & Heartbreak, and  It All Changed in an Instant: More Six-Word Memoirs by Writers Famous & Obscure. Her articles have appeared in O, The Oprah Magazine; Fortune; The Los Angeles Times; the San Francisco Chronicle Magazine; the New York Post; Child; The Huffington Post; San Francisco Magazine and Salon.com, among others. She is a frequent commentator on KQED, Northern California Public Radio and a "City Brights" columnist for the San Francisco Chronicle.

Stephanie Losee has appeared on CBS' The Early Show, CNN Headline News, Fox Business News, and NPR, as well as other television programs and radio shows across the country and in Britain, Europe, and Russia. Her books have been translated into Russian, Korean, and Danish. Losee has taught business writing courses to communications professionals in cities around the world and serves as a writing consultant for several Fortune 500 companies.

From 1990 to 1998 she was a reporter and contributing writer at Fortune, where she covered the technology industry. She was a regular anchor for "The Fortune Business Report" on cable station NY1 News. From 1987 to 1990 she was an editor at PC Magazine.

She graduated from Dartmouth College with an A.B. in English in 1987.

She lives in San Francisco.

1965 births
American non-fiction writers
Dartmouth College alumni
Living people
People from Cold Spring Harbor, New York